Rechcigl is a surname. Notable people with the surname include:

 Miloslav Rechcigl, Sr. (1902–1973), Czech politician, miller and business executive
 Mila Rechcigl, Czech biochemist, nutritionist, and cancer researcher, writer, editor and historian

Czech-language surnames